Edward Archibald may refer to:

Edward Archibald (athlete) (1884–1965), Canadian Olympic pole-vaulter
Edward Mortimer Archibald (1810–1884), Nova Scotian / British lawyer and diplomat
Edward William Archibald (1872–1945), Canadian surgeon